David Elliott (born 7 May 1931) is a British television director and film editor, who worked on various series produced by Gerry Anderson.

References

External links

British film editors
British television directors
Place of birth missing (living people)
1931 births
Living people